Fabien Gabel (born 10 September 1975) is a French conductor.

Biography
As a youth, Gabel began trumpet studies at age 6.  He continued his music education at the Conservatoire National Supérieur de Musique de Paris, where he won a first prize in 1996, and at the Hochschule für Musik Karlsruhe.  His interest in conducting began in his mid-20's.  Gabel won the Donatella Flick Conducting Competition in November 2004, and subsequently served as an assistant conductor with the London Symphony Orchestra as a result of this award.

Gabel was music director of the Orchestre Symphonique de Québec from 2012 to 2021.  Gabel served as music director of the Orchestre Français des Jeunes, initially for the period from 2017 to 2018, and subsequently continuing through 2021.

Discography
 "Ne Me Refuse Pas" with Marie-Nicole Lemieux and the Orchestre National de France (Naïve) 
 Oeuvres de Lucien Guerinel with the Orchestre National de France	 
 Saint-Saëns, Tchaikovsky, works for cello and orchestra: Stéphane Tétreault and the Orchestre Symphonique de Québec (Analekta) 
 Tchaikovsky and Rachmaninov with Natasha Paremski and The Royal Philharmonic
 Saint-Saëns: piano concertos n°2 & n°5, Louis Schwizgebel-Wang, piano, BBC Symphony Orchestra, cond. Martyn Brabbins & Fabien Gabel; label Aparté 2015

Awards and honours
 1st prize for Trumpet at the Conservatoire National Supérieur de Musique de Paris (1996)
 Winner of the Donatella Flick Conducting Competition (2004)
 The 'Académie Charles Cros' award 2011 (Naïve recording)

References

External links
 Official website of Fabien Gabel
 KD Schmid agency English-language page on Fabien Gabel
 Opus 3 Artists agency page on Fabien Gabel

 

French male conductors (music)
1975 births
Musicians from Paris
Living people
21st-century French conductors (music)
21st-century French male musicians